Highway M04 was a Ukraine international highway connecting Znamianka to Krasnodon on the border with Russia, where it continued into Russia as the A260.

In Soviet times the M04 was part of the M21. The highway stretched through four oblasts and ended at the Izvaryne-Donetsk border checkpoint which is part of Krasnodon city (Luhansk Oblast). The section from Znamianka to Debaltseve was part of European route E50, and the section from Debaltseve to the Russian border was part of European route E40. On 28 April 2021, the M04 was decommissioned and merged with the M12 to form the new M30.

War in Donbas
In eastern Ukraine, significant armed conflict has occurred along and near the M04 in the Donetsk and Luhansk Oblasts during the War in Donbass.

Route

Gallery

See also

 Roads in Ukraine
 Ukraine Highways
 International E-road network
 Pan-European corridors

References

External links
National Roads in Ukraine in Russian

European route E40
European route E50
Roads in Dnipro
Roads in Dnipropetrovsk Oblast
Roads in Donetsk Oblast
Roads in Kirovohrad Oblast
Roads in Luhansk Oblast